Ellapalayam is a neighbourhood locality in the city of Erode, Tamil Nadu. This was an independent Village Panchayat till the merger with Erode city that happened in 2011. Now officially, it is a part of Erode Municipal Corporation.

Demographics
 India census, Ellapalayam village had a population of 2,512. Males constitute a population 1,263 and females 1,249. Ellapalayam has an average literacy rate of 66.84%, lower than the state average of 80.09%: male literacy is 75.3%, and female literacy is 58.16%. Among the total population of Ellapalayam, 9% of the population is under 6 years of age.

References

Neighbourhoods in Erode